Philip Stoner Twyford (born 4 May 1963) is a politician from New Zealand and a member of the Labour Party. He has been a Member of Parliament since 2008. He is the Labour Party MP for Te Atatū.

Early years
Twyford was born in 1963 in Auckland. His middle name, Stoner, is the maiden name of his mother. He graduated with a Bachelor of Arts from the University of Auckland in 1999. Before politics he worked as the founding director of Oxfam New Zealand, as a journalist and a trade union organiser.

Member of Parliament
Twyford stood for election in the North Shore electorate at the 2005 and 2008 elections. He placed second both times but in 2008 he was elected as a list MP. Prior to entering Parliament, Twyford was a representative on Labour's policy council. After the resignation of Chris Carter, Twyford contested and won the Te Atatū electorate in the 2011 general election and has retained the electorate since.

Opposition, 2008–2017
Twyford's first nine years as a Member of Parliament were spent in Opposition. He held a range of urban development and foreign affairs portfolios under successive Labour leaders including development assistance, disarmament and arms control (2008–2011), transport or associate transport (2011–2013, 2014–2017), housing (2013–2017) and building and construction (2009–2011, 2015–2017). In his second term, he was ranked 11th in the shadow Cabinet by leader David Shearer and he continued as a senior member of the Opposition under David Cunliffe and, in Twyford's third term, Andrew Little and Jacinda Ardern.

As an Auckland-based member of Parliament Twyford was appointed to the Auckland Governance Committee which examined the National Government's proposals to consolidate Auckland's eight existing local authorities into one "supercity" governed by the Auckland Council. The Labour Party opposed the reforms. In 2009, Twyford promoted the Local Government (Protection of Auckland Assets) Amendment Bill to address concerns that the council amalgamation was partially to allow the sell-off of public assets. The Bill was defeated at first reading. 

A second member's Bill in Twyford's name, the Depleted Uranium (Prohibition) Bill, was selected for debate in September 2010. It proposed a ban on depleted uranium weapons and armour from New Zealand. It was debated in June 2012, and failed to advance on a tied vote.

As housing spokesperson in July 2015, Twyford was criticised for alleged racism when he produced statistics claiming that Chinese foreign buyers were disproportionately buying up real estate in Auckland.

Sixth Labour Government, 2017–present

Twyford was elected as a Cabinet Minister by the Labour Party caucus following Labour's formation of a coalition government with New Zealand First and the Greens, and appointed as the Minister of Housing and Urban Development and the Minister of Transport. In November 2017, Twyford defended his government's proposed Overseas Investment Amendment Act to ban foreign buyers from buying residential property in order to ease the country's housing shortage.

On 24 May 2018, Twyford was dismissed from responsibility for civil aviation (part of the Transport portfolio) after making an unauthorized phone call on a domestic flight as the plane was taking off, a violation of national civil aviation laws. The matter had been raised by Opposition Transport spokesperson Judith Collins. Twyford also offered to resign as Transport Minister but his resignation was turned down by Prime Minister Jacinda Ardern.

On 23 January 2019, Twyford admitted that the Government would not meet its first target of building 1,000 KiwiBuild homes by 1 July 2019, stating that only 300 homes would be built by then.

On 27 June 2019, in Prime Minister Jacinda Ardern's first major reshuffle of the coalition government, Twyford was replaced as Housing Minister by Megan Woods and succeeded David Parker as Minister of Economic Development. He retained the Urban Development and Transport portfolios.

During the 2020 New Zealand general election, Twyford was the subject of a Facebook attack ad by his National Party opponent Alfred Ngaro alleging that Twyford supported recreational cannabis and unlimited abortion. Though Ngaro subsequently deleted his post, Twyford captured a screenshot and accused his opponent of spreading fake news. In response, National Party leader Judith Collins issued a media statement that Ngaro's comments did not represent the views of the party. Twyford retained his seat in Te Atatū by a final margin of 10,508 votes, defeating Ngaro.

Following the 2020 election, Twyford was dropped from Cabinet but remained a Minister outside of Cabinet as Minister for Disarmament and Arms Control, Minister of State for Trade and Export Growth, Associate Minister of Immigration and Associate Minister for the Environment.

In a cabinet reshuffle by new Prime Minister Chris Hipkins on 31 January 2023, Twyford lost all his remaining ministerial portfolios. On 10 February 2023, Twyford was granted retention of the title "The Honourable" for life, in recognition of his term as a member of the Executive Council.

Political views
Twyford identifies as a social democrat. In his maiden speech to Parliament, Twyford expressed support for a New Zealand republic.

References

External links
 

|-

|-

|-

|-

1963 births
Living people
People from Auckland
New Zealand Labour Party MPs
New Zealand list MPs
Unsuccessful candidates in the 2005 New Zealand general election
Members of the New Zealand House of Representatives
New Zealand MPs for Auckland electorates
21st-century New Zealand politicians
Candidates in the 2017 New Zealand general election
Members of the Cabinet of New Zealand
New Zealand republicans
Candidates in the 2020 New Zealand general election